David Blake (born 1971), also known as StankDawg, is the founder of the hacking group Digital DawgPound (DDP) and a long-time member of the hacking community. He is known for being a regular presenter at multiple hacking conferences, but is best known as the creator of the "Binary Revolution" initiative, including being the founding host and producer of  Binary Revolution Radio,  a long-running weekly Internet radio show which ran 200 episodes from 2003 to 2007.

Biography
Blake was born in Newport News, Virginia on September 13, 1971. He received an AAS (Associates in Applied Sciences) degree from the University of Kentucky 1992, and has a BS in Computer Science from Florida Atlantic University as well as a CEH certificate. He presently lives and works as a computer programmer/analyst in Orlando, Florida. Blake is a member of the International High IQ society.

Hacking
StankDawg is a staff writer for the well-known hacker periodical 2600: The Hacker Quarterly, as well as the now-defunct Blacklisted! 411 magazine.  He has also been a contributing writer to several independent zines such as Outbreak, Frequency, and Radical Future.    He has been a frequent co-host of Default Radio and was a regular on Radio Freek America, and has appeared on GAMERadio, Infonomicon, The MindWar, Phreak Phactor, and HPR (Hacker Public Radio).

He has presented at technology conferences such as DEF CON, H.O.P.E., and Interz0ne.  He has been very outspoken about many topics, many of which have gotten some negative feedback from different sources.  His most controversial article was entitled "Hacking google Adwords" at DefCon13 which drew criticism from such people as Jason Calacanis. among others.  His presentation at the fifth H.O.P.E. conference drew some surprise from the AS/400 community.

StankDawg appeared as a subject on the television show The Most Extreme on Animal Planet where he demonstrated the vulnerabilities of wireless internet connections.

Blake chose the handle "StankDawg" in college, where he started a local hacking group which became known as the "Digital DawgPound".

Digital DawgPound

The Digital DawgPound (more commonly referred to as the "DDP") is a group of hackers, best known for a series of articles in hacker magazines such as 2600: The Hacker Quarterly and Make, the long-running webcast Binary Revolution Radio, and a very active set of forums with posts from high-profile hackers  such as Strom Carlson, decoder, Phiber Optik and many more.  The stated mission of the DDP is to propagate a more positive image of hackers than the negative mass media stereotype.  The group welcomes new members who want to learn about hacking, and attempts to teach them more positive aspects and steer them away from the negative aspects by reinforcing the hacker ethic.  Their goal is to show that hackers can, and regularly do, make positive contributions not only to technology, but to society as a whole.

History
The DDP was founded and named by StankDawg. His stated reasons were that he had made many friends in the hacking scene and thought that it would be useful to have everyone begin working together in a more organized fashion.  He was motivated by the fact that there had been other well-known Hacker Groups in the 1980s who had accomplished great things in the hacking world such as the LoD and the MoD. In 1988, while a junior in high school, StankDawg came up with the name on his way to the "Sweet 16" computer programming competition. He jokingly referred to his teammates as "The Digital Dawgpound".

StankDawg lurked in the shadows of the hacking world for many years throughout college under many different pseudonyms.  In 1997 he popped his head out into the public and began becoming more active on IRC and many smaller hacking forums.  He saw some people who he thought were insanely brilliant individuals who seemed to have the same mindset and positive attitude towards hacking that he did so he decided to approach a couple of them to see if anyone would be interested in forming a group and working together.  There was always a huge emphasis not only on technical competence and variety, but also on strength of character and integrity.  The team was a mix of hackers, programmers, phone phreakers, security professionals, and artists.  They had experience in multiple programming languages and operating systems.  DDP members are not only good programmers and hackers, but more importantly, good people.  By 1999 the DDP had its first official members and from this partnership, creativity flowed.

The DDP communicated and worked together on StankDawg's personal site, which was open to anyone who wanted to join in on the fun.  StankDawg was never comfortable with the fact that it was his name that was on the domain and that many people who were coming to the site were coming because of his articles or presentations but not really appreciating all of the other great contributions from other community members that were around.  In 2002, after watching the web site grow quickly, it was decided that a new community needed to be created for these like-minded hackers who were gathering.  This was the start of the biggest DDP project called Binary Revolution which was an attempt at starting a true "community" of hackers.  As the site grew, so did the DDP roster.

Members
Over the years, DDP membership has included several staff writers for 2600: The Hacker Quarterly and Blacklisted! 411 magazine including StankDawg and bland_inquisitor.  They frequently publish articles, provide content, and appear on many media sources across the global Interweb.  DDP members are also regular speakers at hacking conferences such as DEF CON, H.O.P.E., Interzone, Notacon, and many more smaller and more regional cons.

Some DDP members hold memberships in Mensa and the International High IQ society.  StankDawg is very proud of the diversity of the team and has spoken to this many times on Binary Revolution Radio.  Members are from both coasts of the United States to Europe and have even had members from Jamaica, Brazil, and many other countries.

Recognition
The DDP maintains a blog "which they refer to as a "blawg" (Obviously a play on the intentionally misspelled word "Dawg"). Posts by DDP members have been featured on other technology-related sites such as those of Make Magazine,
HackADay,
Hacked Gadgets, and others.

Binary Revolution
In 2003, StankDawg moved the forums from his personal site over to a new site as part of a project called the Binary Revolution which he considered a "movement" towards a more positive hacking community.

This "Binary Revolution" is the best known of the DDP projects and is commonly referred to simply as "BinRev".  This project was created in an attempt to bring the hacking community back together, working towards a common, positive goal of reclaiming the name of hackers.  The Binary Revolution emphasizes positive aspects of hacking and projects that help society.  It does this in a variety of outlets including monthly meetings, the weekly radio show Binary Revolution Radio(BRR), a video-based series of shows called HackTV, and very active message board forums.

BinRev is more than just a radio show or forums, although they are certainly the most well-known of the projects.  It is actually composed of many parts.

Binary Revolution Radio
Binary Revolution Radio, often shortened to "BRR", was one part of the binrev community.  Started and hosted by Blake in 2003, it featured different co-hosts each week, and covered different aspects of hacker culture and computer security.

It was broadcast via internet stream, usually prerecorded in Florida on a weekend, and then edited and released on the following Tuesday, on the DDP Hack Radio stream at 9:30pm EST. Topics included phreaking, identity theft, cryptography, operating systems, programming languages, free and open source software, Wi-Fi and bluetooth, social engineering, cyberculture, and information about various hacker conventions such as PhreakNIC, ShmooCon, H.O.P.E., and Def Con.

In July 2005 Blake announced that he was going to take a break, and so for the third season, the show was produced by Black Ratchet and Strom Carlson (who had been frequent co-hosts during Blake's run). During the time that they hosted the program, the format rotated between the standard prerecorded format, and a live format which included phone calls from listeners.

Blake returned to the show in May 2006.  He maintained the prerecorded format, and brought more community input into the show, by bringing on more members of the Binary Revolution community.  For the first episode of the fourth season, BRR had its first ever broadcast in front of live audience during the HOPE 6 convention in New York City, June 2006.

The final episode, #200, took place on October 30, 2007, with a marathon episode which clocked in at 7 hours and 12 minutes.

Notable co-hosts 
Tom Cross (as "Decius")
Elonka Dunin
Jason Scott
Lance James
Mark Spencer
Virgil Griffith
MC Frontalot
Lucky225
Strom Carlson
Black Rachet

BinRev Meetings
As the forums grew there were many posts where people were looking for others in their area where other hacker meetings did not exist or were not approachable for some reason.  Those places that did have meetings were sparse on information.  Binary Revolution meetings were started as an answer to these problems and as a place for our forum members to get together.  BinRev meetings offer free web hosting for all meetings to help organize the meetings and keep communications alive and to help projects to grow.  Some meetings are in large cities like Chicago and Orlando while others are in small towns.  Anyone can start their own BinRev meeting by asking in the BinRev forums.

BinRev.net
"BRnet" is the official IRC network of Binary Revolution.  It is active at all hours of the day and contains a general #binrev channel but also contains many other channels for more specific and productive discussion.

HackTV
In the middle of 2003, he released an Internet video show entitled "HackTV" which was the first internet television show about hacking, and which has grown into a series of several different shows. They were released irregularly since most of the episodes were filmed by StankDawg in South Florida where he lived at the time. They wanted the show to appear professional in terms of quality, but this made cooperating over the internet difficult.  Sharing large video files was difficult and encoded video caused editing problems and quality concerns.  The original show was released as full-length 30 minute episodes.  This was also a problem since it because more and more difficult to get enough material for full-length episodes.  There was also some content that was related to hacking only on a fringe level and StankDawg did not feel it was appropriate to include in the show.  This led to other ideas.

HackTV:Underground
In light of the difficulties of putting together the full HackTV original show, and in an attempt to make the show more accessible for community contributions, StankDawg launched a new series that was less focused on format and video quality that focused  more on content and ease of participation.  This series was titled "HackTV:Underground" or "HTV:U" for short.  This series allowed anyone to contribute content in any format and at any length or video quality.  The allowed people to film things with basic cameraphone quality video if this was the only way to get the content.  One episode of HackTV:U was used by G4techTV show called "Torrent".

HackTV:Pwned
This series of HackTV was a prank style show, similar to the popular "Punk'd" show on MTV at the time.  Even the logo is an obvious parody of the Punk'd logo.  This series contains pranks that mostly took place at conferences, but is also open to social engineering and other light-hearted content.

DocDroppers
The DocDroppers project is a community project to create a centralized place to store hacking articles and information while still maintaining some formatting and readability.  Old ascii text files existed scattered across the internet but they come and go quickly and are difficult to find.  They are usually formatted with the very basics and sometimes difficult to read.  DocDroppers allows users to submit articles to a centralized place where they can be searchable, easily maintained, and easy to read and reference.

Recently, this project has grown to include encyclopedia style entries on many hacking topics after many were deleted from sites such as Wikipedia.  This has caused DocDroppers to include a section on hacker history and culture among its content.

Selected writing
 "Stupid Webstats Tricks", Autumn 2005, 2600 Magazine
 "Hacking Google AdWords", Summer 2005, 2600 Magazine
 "Disposable Email Vulnerabilities", Spring 2005, 2600 Magazine
 "How to Hack The Lottery", Fall 2004, 2600 Magazine
 "Robots and Spiders", Winter 2003, 2600 Magazine
 "A History of 31337sp34k", Fall 2002, 2600 Magazine
 "Transaction Based Systems", Spring 2002, 2600 Magazine
 "Batch vs. Interactive", Summer 1999, 2600 Magazine

Selected presentations
 "The Art of Electronic Deduction",  July 2006, H.O.P.E. Number Six (presented again at Interz0ne 5, Saturday March 11, 2006)
 "Hacking Google AdWords", July 2005, DEF CON 13
 "AS/400: Lifting the veil of obscurity", July 2004, The fifth H.O.P.E.

Projects
Projects that StankDawg was directly involved in creating/maintaining in addition to the ones mentioned above.
 DDP HackRadio - A streaming radio station with a schedule of hacking and tech related shows.
 Binary Revolution Magazine - The printed hacking magazine put out by the DDP.
 Hacker Events - A calendar for all hacking conferences, events, meetings, or other related gatherings.
 Hacker Media - A portal for all hacking, phreaking, and other related media shows.
 Phreak Phactor  - The world's first Hacking reality radio show.
 WH4F - "Will Hack For Food" gives secure disposable temporary email accounts.

References

External links
Other links that were mentioned or referred to in this entry:
 StankDawg's personal site.
 The Digital DawgPound - official site.
 BinRev IRC - Binary Revolution official IRC channel web site & BinRev IRC - Official Binary Revolution IRC network.
 HPR - "Hacker Public Radio" is a daily hacking and technology radio show created by the DDP, infonomicon and others. It has many different hosts.
 BRR Archive - Archive of the hacking radio show presented by members of the DDP (07/2003-10/2007).
 Binary Revolution Meetings  - Monthly hacker meetings that encourage participation and offers free hosting for all meetings.
 HackTV - The Internet's first full-length regular Hacking video show.
 Old Skool Phreak - Home of many phreaking related text files.
 RFA Archive - Weekly Radio show about Technology, Privacy and Freedom (02/2002 - 02/2004).

1971 births
Living people
Computer programmers
People associated with computer security
Internet radio in the United States
Phreaking
People from Newport News, Virginia